Nils Strandell (20 May 1876 – 20 or 28 July 1963) was a Swedish philatelist who signed the Roll of Distinguished Philatelists in 1922. He was President of Honour at the STOCKHOLMIA 55 stamp exhibition.

References

Signatories to the Roll of Distinguished Philatelists
Swedish philatelists
1876 births
1963 deaths